Kenneth Mackenzie (10 June 1863 – 20 April 1945) was an Anglican bishop in the mid 20th century. Born in Edinburgh, Scotland, the son of Lord Mackenzie, he was educated at Loretto School and Keble College, Oxford and ordained after a period of study at Ripon College Cuddesdon in 1891.

His ecclesiastical career began as a curate at St Mary Redcliffe, Bristol, England, after which he began a 12-year stint at St Paul's Cathedral, Dundee: being successively curate, rector and its first provost when it achieved cathedral status in 1905.

In 1907 he was elevated to the episcopate as Bishop of Argyll and The Isles, a post he held until 1942.

In 1897 he married Alice White (1865–1944), daughter of James Farquhar White of Balruddery, Perthshire.  They had two sons and four daughters, including Canon Kenneth Nigel Mackenzie (1901–1964).

References

1863 births
People educated at Loretto School, Musselburgh
Alumni of Keble College, Oxford
Alumni of Ripon College Cuddesdon
Provosts of St Paul's Cathedral, Dundee
Bishops of Argyll and The Isles
20th-century Scottish Episcopalian bishops
1945 deaths